Heartbeat Radio is the fifth album by Norwegian singer-songwriter and guitarist Sondre Lerche.  The album was released in the U.S. on September 8, 2009, and in Europe on September 14. The album was released on Rounder Records, and is distributed digitally, on CD and on vinyl LP.

The first single and title track, "Heartbeat Radio", was sent to rock radio in July 2009.

Track listing
All songs written by Sondre Lerche.

"Good Luck" – 5:13
"Heartbeat Radio" – 4:04
"I Cannot Let You Go" – 4:45
"Like Lazenby" – 3:23
"If Only" – 3:54
"Pioneer" – 2:08
"Easy to Persuade" – 3:43
"Words & Music" – 3:29
"I Guess It's Gonna Rain Today" – 4:03
"Almighty Moon" – 4:33
"Don't Look Now" – 3:12
"Goodnight" – 3:51

References

External links
Sondre Lerche's official site—release updates and release information for additional countries

2009 albums
Sondre Lerche albums
Rounder Records albums